Gianfranco Rotondi (born 25 July 1960) is an Italian politician and a member of the Chamber of Deputies.

Biography 
Rotondi was born in Avellino, Campania.

Political career
Graduated in law, he was first elected in the Chamber of Deputies in 2001 as member of the House of Freedoms and Union of Christian and Centre Democrats in the uninominal electorate of Rho. However, in 2005, he left UDC over disagreements about the relationship with Silvio Berlusconi's Forza Italia, which Rotondi wanted to be closer. He then founded a new party strongly inspired on Christian ideals and the former Christian Democracy party, called Christian Democracy for the Autonomies.
In 2008, his party joined the People of Freedom, and he was appointed Minister without Portfolio for the Implementation of the Government Program in Berlusconi IV Cabinet, a position he held until 16 November 2011.

On 2 April 2022, Rotondi founded a new party named Green is Popular, a Christian democratic and green-conservative movement. Soon after that, he ended his alliance with Forza Italia and federated with Brothers of Italy.

References

External links
Profile at Italian Chamber of Deputies
Profile at Italian Senate (2006–2008)

1960 births
Living people
People from Avellino
Christian Democracy (Italy) politicians
United Christian Democrats politicians
Union of the Centre (2002) politicians
Christian Democracy for the Autonomies politicians
The People of Freedom politicians
Forza Italia (2013) politicians
Christian Revolution politicians
Deputies of Legislature XII of Italy
Deputies of Legislature XIV of Italy
Senators of Legislature XV of Italy
Deputies of Legislature XVI of Italy
Deputies of Legislature XVIII of Italy
Politicians of Campania